Karapet Chalyan (born 7 August 1993) is an Armenian Greco-Roman wrestler. He is a silver medalist at the European Games and a two-time bronze medalist at the European Wrestling Championships. He also represented Armenia at the 2020 Summer Olympics held in Tokyo, Japan.

Career 

In 2019, he represented Armenia at the European Games in Minsk, Belarus and he won the silver medal in the 77 kg event. In the final, he lost against Aleksandr Chekhirkin of Russia.

He won one of the bronze medals in the 77 kg event at the 2020 European Wrestling Championships held in Rome, Italy. In the same year, he competed in the men's 77 kg event at the 2020 Individual Wrestling World Cup held in Belgrade, Serbia. In 2021, he lost his bronze medal match in the 82 kg event at the 2021 European Wrestling Championships in Warsaw, Poland.

He competed in the men's 77 kg event at the 2020 Summer Olympics held in Tokyo, Japan. He lost his bronze medal match against Rafig Huseynov of Azerbaijan.

He competed in the 82kg event at the 2022 World Wrestling Championships held in Belgrade, Serbia.

Achievements

References

External links 
 
 
 

1993 births
Living people
Place of birth missing (living people)
Armenian male sport wrestlers
Wrestlers at the 2019 European Games
European Games silver medalists for Armenia
European Games medalists in wrestling
European Wrestling Championships medalists
Wrestlers at the 2020 Summer Olympics
Olympic wrestlers of Armenia
20th-century Armenian people
21st-century Armenian people